Stephen N. Lackey (born January 22, 1980) is a public affairs advisor, philanthropist and political fundraiser lauded for creating opportunities for large corporations and private donors to filter financial support into their communities.  Lackey is the founder and head of The Stephen Lackey Trust, a think tank which works as a clearinghouse of ideas to solve global problems.  He is most noted as a campaign bundler for the Republican Party.

Public Affairs 
Lackey has provided nonprofit development and public affairs support to a number of organizations, and most notably worked as one of the youngest fundraising and development professionals for a major nonprofit in the state of Tennessee.  He is also the organizer of TEDxSweetAuburn held in Atlanta, Georgia.

Philanthropy 
In 2010 Lackey consolidated his many giving programs into the Adults Getting Educated (AGE) nonprofit. The organization administers the 'Coming of AGE Scholarship' which supports college students in four states who have earned the GED credential.

Political Fundraising 
Lackey began quietly forming partnerships between African-American donors (mostly black pastors) and conservative candidates during the second Bush campaign, eventually moving back to Atlanta to develop strategies and programs to connect black conservatives.  In 2011 he went public with this work, becoming a pundit and strategist for the conservative agenda.  In 2012, BET News named Stephen N. Lackey in their annual 'Republicans to Watch' photo list.  He planned and hosted the Quarles & Brady, LLP sponsored Republican Visions Luncheon, the largest African-American Conservative event at the 2012 GOP Convention in Tampa, FL.

Lackey recently gained national attention for interviews with The Huffington Post - The Black Republican Dilemma , NewsOne - Being Black and Republican in the Obama Era and BET - GOP Forms Future Majority Caucus.

See also
 List of African-American Republicans

References

1980 births
Living people
American lobbyists
Georgia (U.S. state) Republicans
American political fundraisers
People from Atlanta
African-American people in Georgia (U.S. state) politics
21st-century African-American people
20th-century African-American people